Askot or Askote ( Kumaoni:असकोट) is a small Himalayan town in Pithoragarh district of Uttarakhand in India. It is the part of Kanalichhina development Block and Didihat Tehsil.

The place is also famous for the Askot Musk Deer Sanctuary dedicated to the conservation of Musk deer. Askot lies midway between Pithoragarh to Dharchula road and located on a ridge. 'Kailash-Mansarovar Pilgrimage route from Delhi - Kathgodam - Didihat - Dharchula, passes through Askot.

along with surrounded regions the area was once part of Manaskhand region and came under Katyuri kings after fall of katyuris the Rajwars dynasty which was a branch katyuri kings continued to rule the region, ruled by Pal Rajput/Thakuri (Suryavanshi Rajputs, a clan of Katyuri kings), Chand, Gorkha, Raikas and British rulers, though Rajwars continue to be its ceremonial Head. Van Rawats - an endangered tribe of Uttaranchal, inhabits around this area.

Geography
It has an average elevation of 1,106 metres (3,629 feet).
It is located on Gori Ganga- Kali river geographical divide. Under beautiful natural setting of trees like Pinus, Quercus and Rhododendron, etc., are at the backdrop of Chhiplakot and Panchchuli . The Fertile slopes of Garkha are situated on the front side, and Kali river and mountains of Nepal on its left.

The area around is under heavy tunnel mining operations. There are polymetallic mines of copper, zinc, gold, silver and lead deposits.

Origin of name
The name Askot is originated from Assi Kot (Eighty Forts,  as the King had eighty forts under him). Many of these forts were in Darchula District of Nepal.

History
Askot was ruled by a branch of Katyuri kings. After the breakdown of Katyuri Dynasty, King Abhay Pal, the grandson of Katyuri King, Brahm Deo (the Pals original last name was 'Deo' but one of their ancestors called Kunwar Abhay Pal  Deo, wrote his surname as Pal and the generations after him followed suit), brought a branch of Katyuri Dynasty, here as the Rajwars, and established the state of Askot, by taking it as a grant from Kings of Doti in 1279 AD. But Dev was surname used by Katyuri's, some migrated from Joshimath to Katyur Ghati, Baijnath, & other parts of Kumoun, Pithoragarh,  Askot, and then to Nepal, making temples on the same architecture as followed by Katyuris

Later on they came under Chand rulers. From 1279 to 1588 the descendants of Abhay Pal, the Rajbar dynasty ruled over the region,

Later there is a Strong off shoot known as Mahson Mahuli Raj (Uttar Pradesh). Alakh  Deo  Grandson Abay Pal Deo of Askote and Great Grand son  of Emperor of the Might Katyuri Bhram Deo,  led an army into plains of north Eastern UP and engaged  the local tribal king in a ferocious  battle in which Alakh Deo and his Suryavanshi  Rajput forces emerged victorious.  Alakh Deo established his capital  32 in away from  Basti in Mahuli  in 1305. The area was covered with thick jungles and swamps and the Ghagra river in south 
and Rapti river in east protected this region from heavy attacks. The feudal kingdom of Mahson and Mahuli stretched 14 Kose 47 (km). 

Administratively, at that time, Askot had two regions-Malla Askot and Talla Askot. This area came under Gorkha control (1791-1815) but the descendants continued to fight against each other. This family feud continued even after the British defeated the Gorkhas in 1815. Before Askot became Capital, the king used to live at Lakhanpur Kot, near the now Bagarihat (Bagar means river bank) village on the right bank of river Kali. It was situated at the base of Champhachal mountain. The remnants of the fort and market are still here.

Source:
History of Kumaun

References

Tourism in Uttarakhand
Villages in Pithoragarh district
Former kingdoms